The Peninsula Shanghai is a luxury hotel among The Peninsula Hotel Group. It was ranked the No. 8 hotel in the world by Travel + Leisure in 2015. The Peninsula Shanghai opened in 2009 and is The Hong Kong and Shanghai Hotels second hotel in Mainland China. Its address is No.32 Zhongshan East First Road, Shanghai 200002, China.

References 

Shanghai
Hotels in Shanghai
Hotels established in 2009